is a junction railway station in the city of Tochigi, Tochigi Prefecture, Japan, operated by the private railway operator Tōbu Railway. The station is numbered "TN-12".

Lines
Shin-Tochigi Station is served by the Tōbu Nikkō Line, and is also a terminal station of the Tōbu Utsunomiya Line.

Station layout
This station consists of one side platform and one island platform, connected to the station building by a footbridge.

Platforms

Adjacent stations

History
Shin-Tochigi Station opened on 1 April 1929.

From 17 March 2012, station numbering was introduced on all Tōbu lines, with Shin-Tochigi Station becoming "TN-12".

Passenger statistics
In fiscal 2019, the station was used by an average of 4163 passengers daily (boarding passengers only).

Surrounding area
 Tochigi Post Office
 Tochigi Fire Department

See also
 List of railway stations in Japan

References

External links

  

Railway stations in Tochigi Prefecture
Stations of Tobu Railway
Railway stations in Japan opened in 1929
Tobu Nikko Line
Tobu Utsunomiya Line
Tochigi, Tochigi